Francesco Morosini may refer to:

Francesco Morosini (1619-1694), a Venetian general and Doge of Venice (1688-1694)
 Francesco Morosini, list of Italian Navy ships named after Francesco Morosini